The Batman is a 2022 American superhero film based on the DC Comics character Batman. Produced by DC Films, 6th & Idaho, and Dylan Clark Productions, and distributed by Warner Bros. Pictures, it is a reboot of the Batman film franchise. The film was directed by Matt Reeves, who wrote the screenplay with Peter Craig. It stars Robert Pattinson as Bruce Wayne / Batman alongside Zoë Kravitz, Paul Dano, Jeffrey Wright, John Turturro, Peter Sarsgaard, Andy Serkis, and Colin Farrell. The film sees Batman, who has been fighting crime in Gotham City for two years, uncover corruption while pursuing the Riddler (Dano), a serial killer who targets Gotham's corrupt elite.

Development began after Ben Affleck was cast as Batman in the DC Extended Universe (DCEU) in 2013. Affleck signed on to direct, produce, co-write, and star in The Batman, but had reservations about the project and dropped out. Reeves took over and reworked the story, removing the DCEU connections. He sought to explore Batman's detective side more than previous films, drawing inspiration from the films of Alfred Hitchcock and the New Hollywood era, and comics such as Year One (1987), The Long Halloween (1996–97), and Ego (2000). Pattinson was cast in May 2019, with further casting in late 2019. Filming began in the United Kingdom in January 2020, but was halted in March by the COVID-19 pandemic. It resumed later in the year and concluded in Chicago in March 2021.

After the COVID-19 pandemic caused two delays to its original June 2021 release date, The Batman premiered at the Lincoln Center in Manhattan on March 1, 2022, and was theatrically released worldwide on March 4. The film was a commercial success, and grossed over $771million against a $185–200million budget, making it the seventh-highest-grossing film of 2022. It received positive reviews from critics, with praise for the performances, musical score, cinematography, Reeves' direction, editing, visual style, action sequences, and story, although the runtime received some criticism. At the 95th Academy Awards, it received nominations for Best Sound, Best Makeup and Hairstyling, and Best Visual Effects. The Batman is intended to launch a Batman shared universe, with two sequels planned and three spin-off television series in development for HBO Max, which include The Penguin starring Farrell. The first sequel, titled The Batman – Part II, is set for release on October 3, 2025.

Plot 

On Halloween, Gotham City Mayor Don Mitchell Jr. is murdered by the Riddler, a masked serial killer. Reclusive billionaire Bruce Wayne, who has operated for two years as the vigilante Batman, investigates the murder alongside the Gotham City Police Department (GCPD). Lieutenant James Gordon discovers a message that the Riddler left for Batman. The following night, the Riddler kills Commissioner Pete Savage and leaves another message for Batman.

Batman and Gordon discover that the Riddler left a thumb drive in Mitchell's car containing images of Mitchell with a woman, Annika Kosolov, at the Iceberg Lounge—a nightclub operated by Oswald "The Penguin" Cobblepot, crime boss Carmine Falcone's lieutenant. While the Penguin pleads ignorance, Batman notices that Selina Kyle, Annika's roommate, works at the club as a waitress. When Annika disappears, Batman sends Selina back to the Iceberg Lounge for answers and discovers that Savage was on Falcone's payroll, as is district attorney Gil Colson.

The Riddler abducts Colson, straps a timed collar bomb to his neck, and sends him to interrupt Mitchell's funeral. When Batman arrives, the Riddler calls him via Colson's phone and threatens to detonate the bomb if Colson cannot answer three riddles. Colson refuses to answer the third—the name of the informant who gave the GCPD information that led to a historic drug bust ending gangster Salvatore Maroni's operation—and is killed when the bomb explodes, which also knocks Batman unconscious. Batman is taken into custody, but Gordon helps him escape. Later, Batman and Gordon deduce that the informant may be the Penguin and track him to a drug deal. They discover that Maroni's operation transferred to Falcone, with many corrupt GCPD officers involved. Selina inadvertently exposes them when she arrives to steal money and discovers Annika's corpse in the trunk of a car. After a car chase, Batman captures the Penguin, but he and Gordon learn the Penguin is not the informant.

Batman and Gordon follow the Riddler's trail to the ruins of an orphanage funded by Bruce's murdered parents, Thomas and Martha Wayne, where they learn that the Riddler holds a grudge against the Wayne family. Bruce's butler and caretaker, Alfred Pennyworth, is hospitalized after opening a letter bomb addressed to Bruce. The Riddler leaks evidence that Thomas, who was running for mayor before he was murdered, hired Falcone to kill a journalist who was writing a story about Martha's family history of mental illness. Bruce confronts Alfred, who maintains that Thomas only asked Falcone to threaten the journalist into silence; Thomas planned to turn himself and Falcone over to the police once he found out Falcone murdered the journalist instead. Alfred believes that Falcone had Thomas and Martha killed to silence them.

Selina reveals to Batman that Falcone is her father, and that he murdered both her mother and Annika, killing the latter because she found out that he was the informant. She tries to kill Falcone, but he overpowers and tries to kill her. Batman and Gordon arrive in time to save her and arrest Falcone, but the Riddler shoots him dead with a sniper rifle moments later. The Riddler is revealed to be forensic accountant Edward Nashton, and is incarcerated in Arkham State Hospital, where he tells Batman he took inspiration from him when targeting the corrupt. Batman learns that Nashton has planted car bombs around Gotham and cultivated an online following that plans to assassinate Mayor-elect Bella Reál.

The bombs destroy the seawall around Gotham and flood the city. Nashton's followers attempt to kill Reál, but Batman and Selina manage to stop them. In the aftermath, Nashton befriends another inmate, while Selina deems Gotham beyond saving and leaves. Batman aids recovery efforts and vows to inspire hope in Gotham.

Cast 

 Robert Pattinson as Bruce Wayne / Batman:A reclusive billionaire who obsessively protects Gotham City as a masked vigilante to cope with his traumatic past. Batman is around 30 years old and is not yet an experienced crime fighter, as director Matt Reeves wanted to explore the character before he becomes "fully formed". Reeves and Pattinson described Batman as an insomniac who cannot delineate between the Batman persona and his "recluse rockstar" public identity as Bruce, with Reeves comparing his obsession with being Batman to a drug addiction. Pattinson said the film questions the nature of heroism, as Batman is more flawed than traditional superheroes and unable to control himself, seeking to work out his rage and "inflict his kind of justice". Reeves considered The Batman a story about Batman learning that he must not exact vengeance, but inspire hope. Oscar Novak portrays a young Bruce, while Rick English was Pattinson's stunt double.
 Zoë Kravitz as Selina Kyle / Catwoman:A nightclub waitress, drug dealer, and cat burglar who meets Batman while searching for her missing roommate; her moral ambiguity challenges Batman's black-and-white view of good and evil. Kravitz said the character is becoming a femme fatale and "figuring out who she is, beyond just someone trying to survive". She described her as a mysterious character with unclear motivations, who represents femininity in contrast to Batman's masculinity. She said the pair are "partner[s] in crime", drawn together by their desire to fight for vulnerable people. Reeves saw Selina as Batman's awakening to his own sheltered upbringing and preconceived assumptions. Kravitz focused more on Selina than her Catwoman persona because she did not want to distract from the character's emotional journey, and interpreted Selina as bisexual, like the comics.
 Paul Dano as Edward Nashton / Riddler:A forensic accountant who is inspired by Batman to become a serial killer who targets elite Gotham citizens and livestreams his crimes. An orphan raised in abject poverty, he resents Gotham's rich and powerful for ignoring the less fortunate, and seeks to "unmask the truth" about Gotham, taunting Batman and law enforcement with riddles. Reeves said Batman inspiring the Riddler reflects the idea from the comics that he creates his own enemies and that the Riddler's attack on Gotham gives the character a "political agenda" as a terrorist-like figure. He found Batman and the Riddler being "kind of two sides of the same coin" unsettling, as they have similar goals. He likened the Riddler to the Zodiac Killer, who he felt was the "real-life" Riddler for his practice of communicating with ciphers and riddles, while Dano said his performance balanced the real-life basis with the Batman franchise's theatricality. Joseph Walker portrays a young Nashton.
 Jeffrey Wright as James Gordon:An ally of Batman in the Gotham City Police Department (GCPD). He is the only GCPD officer whom Batman trusts, and they work together to solve the Riddler case. Wright described Gordon as "relative to Gotham City, to the Gotham City Police Department, to Batman, to justice and to corruption". Similar to Christopher Nolan's The Dark Knight Trilogy (2005–2012), Gordon begins as a GCPD lieutenant in The Batman, allowing his progression to commissioner to be depicted in subsequent films. Wright felt starting Gordon as the lieutenant enabled him to play a larger role compared to previous film iterations. Reeves felt that Batman and Gordon's partnership is emphasized more in The Batman than it was in previous Batman films, and compared them to Carl Bernstein (Dustin Hoffman) and Bob Woodward (Robert Redford) from All the President's Men (1974).
 John Turturro as Carmine Falcone:A Gotham crime boss and Selina's father. The Riddler's primary target, Falcone has much of Gotham under his control; Turturro described him as a "dangerous guy", while Reeves said he was "seemingly...a genteel mobster but [he] turns out to have a very, very dark history behind him" and compared him to Noah Cross (John Huston) from Chinatown (1974). The Batman suggests that Falcone played a role in Batman's origin story by ordering the murder of Thomas and Martha Wayne. Falcone wears vintage sunglasses throughout the film, as Turturro felt the character needed a "mask".
 Peter Sarsgaard as Gil Colson: Gotham's district attorney, whom Sarsgaard described as untruthful and "distasteful".
 Andy Serkis as Alfred Pennyworth:Batman's butler and mentor, though they have a strained relationship and rarely speak. Pattinson described Alfred as Batman's only confidant, even though Alfred "thinks he's gone insane!" Alfred has a military background, which is reflected in him being "used to rules and regulations, structure and precision" as well as his dress and demeanor. To illustrate Alfred's physical appearance as a military veteran, Reeves came up with the idea of him having a cane, while Serkis suggested his facial scars. Serkis shared that Alfred was "part of the secret service and then the security team looking after Wayne Enterprises"; his background led to him becoming more of a "mentor and a teacher" than the father figure that Bruce needed. Reeves noted that Alfred was forced into becoming Bruce's parental figure despite being inexperienced, and feels guilty that his parenting of Bruce might have led to his obsessive journey as Batman.
 Colin Farrell as Oswald "Oz" Cobblepot / Penguin:Falcone's chief lieutenant who operates the Iceberg Lounge, the nightclub where Selina works. He is not yet the crime kingpin he is depicted as in the comics, and dislikes being referred to as the Penguin. Reeves explained that the Penguin is a "mid-level mobster guy and he's got a bit of showmanship to him, but you can see that he wants more and that he's been underestimated". Reeves compared the Penguin to Fredo Corleone (John Cazale) from The Godfather (1972), due to "the insignificance that he lives within, in a family that is full of very strong, very bright, very capable, very violent men."

Additionally, Jayme Lawson portrays Bella Reál, a mayoral candidate for Gotham City who Reeves said represents hope; Gil Perez-Abraham portrays Martinez, a GCPD officer; Peter McDonald portrays William Kenzie, a corrupt GCPD officer; Alex Ferns portrays Pete Savage, the GCPD commissioner; Con O'Neill portrays Mackenzie Bock, the GCPD chief; and Rupert Penry-Jones portrays Don Mitchell Jr., Gotham's mayor. Barry Keoghan makes a cameo appearance as the Joker (credited as "Unseen Arkham Prisoner"), while other cast members include twins Charlie and Max Carver as Iceberg Lounge bouncers (credited as "The Twins"); Hana Hrzic as Annika, Selina's roommate; Jay Lycurgo as a young gang member; Akie Kotabe as a train passenger; Sandra Dickinson as Dory, Bruce's caretaker and housekeeper; Luke Roberts and Stella Stocker as Bruce's parents, Thomas and Martha Wayne.

Production

Development

Ben Affleck 

In August 2013, Ben Affleck was cast as Bruce Wayne / Batman for multiple films set in the DC Extended Universe (DCEU). He made his debut in Batman v Superman: Dawn of Justice (2016) before appearing in Suicide Squad (2016) and Justice League (2017). In October 2014, Warner Bros. revealed plans for a standalone Batman film starring Affleck, and he was in negotiations to direct and co-write the screenplay with Geoff Johns by July 2015. Production was expected to begin after Affleck finished work on Live by Night (2016).

Affleck and Johns finished the first draft in March 2016. Set after the events of Batman v Superman and Justice League, the script told an original story inspired by comic book elements, an approach that Affleck compared to director Zack Snyder's Batman v Superman story, with specific influence from Arkham Asylum: A Serious House on Serious Earth (1989) and "Knightfall" (1992–1994) as well as the video game Batman: Arkham Asylum (2009). Cinematographer Robert Richardson, who was attached early in development, confirmed that the script was primarily set in Arkham Asylum. It featured Slade Wilson / Deathstroke orchestrating a breakout at Arkham to tire Batman and make him vulnerable, before fighting him in the streets of Gotham during the climax. Batgirl was planned to appear and help Batman. Johns said the film would also explore the death of Robin, which was hinted at in Batman v Superman.

Warner Bros. CEO Kevin Tsujihara confirmed at CinemaCon in April 2016 that Affleck was directing. Jeremy Irons said he would reprise his Batman v Superman role of Alfred Pennyworth in May, and Joe Manganiello was cast as Deathstroke in September. Manganiello explained that Deathstroke believed Batman was responsible for his son's death and was depicted as systematically dismantling Batman's life and killing those close to him like a "horror movie villain". He compared the story to David Fincher's The Game (1997). Snyder enjoyed the story and filmed a post-credits scene for Justice League—featuring Lex Luthor (Jesse Eisenberg) revealing Batman's secret identity to Deathstroke—to help set up the film. Affleck revealed the title was The Batman in October, and in December he said filming was on track to begin in mid-2017 for a 2018 release. That month, a planned Justice League sequel was delayed to accommodate The Batman. Chris Terrio turned in a rewrite of the script in January 2017.

Affleck began to have reservations about directing the film and announced in January 2017 that he was stepping down as director but still planned to star and produce. He initially said he had stepped down to focus more on starring as Batman but soon stated that he had been unable to get the script where he needed it and felt it was time for someone else to "have a shot at it". Affleck later added that he did not think he would have enjoyed directing the film and felt it should be directed by someone who would love working on it. At the time, Warner Bros. was re-evaluating its approach to superhero films following the release of Batman v Superman, which led to Affleck's film being "sidelined" according to Borys Kit of The Hollywood Reporter. The Justice League post-credits scene was altered in post-production to tease the Injustice League in a Justice League sequel instead of Deathstroke's role in The Batman, though the original was restored in the 2021 director's cut Zack Snyder's Justice League.

Matt Reeves 

Matt Reeves, Matt Ross, Ridley Scott, Gavin O'Connor, George Miller, Denis Villeneuve, and Fede Álvarez were all considered as replacements for Affleck as director. Reeves, a longtime Batman fan, quickly moved to the top of the shortlist and entered negotiations after meeting with Warner Bros. on February 10, 2017. Warner Bros. sent Reeves a copy of the script, but Reeves felt that Affleck's take, while "totally valid", was not the film he wanted to make. Reeves only wanted to join if he was guaranteed creative control, and Warner Bros. Pictures Group chair Toby Emmerich—who wanted an "auteur" to make the next Batman film—was impressed by his initial ideas. An issue with his salary soon arose, but it was quickly overcome, and Reeves was hired to direct The Batman on February 23. He was also set to produce the film with Dylan Clark. Reeves was not willing to share his full vision with the studio while he was working on War for the Planet of the Apes (2017), and Warner Bros. agreed to delay production until he was available.

Reeves began working on the script in March 2017. He initially planned to keep The Batman connections to the DCEU, and spoke with Affleck during the writing process, but soon reworked the story to focus on Batman earlier in his vigilante career, with plans to cast a younger actor to play Batman; Warner Bros. was planning to replace Affleck by July 2017. In August 2018, Affleck went to rehabilitation for alcohol abuse, and it was considered unlikely that he would reprise his role in the film after that. On a Television Critics Association panel in August 2018, Reeves said the script was nearing completion. He hoped to finish it within a couple of weeks and was aiming to begin production in early-to-mid-2019. Reeves submitted his first draft to Warner Bros. the following month. Mattson Tomlin and Peter Craig also contributed to the script, though only Reeves and Craig received credit. Tomlin used some of the ideas he developed for The Batman in a comic book limited series, Batman: The Imposter (2021).

In January 2019, Warner Bros. set a June 25, 2021, release date for The Batman, and Affleck confirmed that he was no longer starring. Affleck explained that he stepped down due to a combination of factors, including his divorce from Jennifer Garner, the tumultuous production of Justice League, his lack of enjoyment in the role at that point, and his alcohol problems. Elaborating on his Justice League experience, Affleck said it had particularly soured his interest in the role since it involved his divorce, frequent traveling, and competing agendas, as well as the death of Snyder's daughter Autumn (which led to the director's exit from the project) and the subsequent extensive reshoots for the film. Affleck recalled that he had shown a version of The Batman script to a friend who said, "I think the script is good. I also think you'll drink yourself to death if you go through what you just went through [on Justice League] again."

Writing 
When Reeves decided to focus on Batman earlier in his vigilante career, he began writing a new script from scratch. Affleck's script had taken an action-driven, "James Bond-ian" approach, but Reeves wanted a more personal narrative that "rock[ed Batman] to his core". He wanted to explore how the Batman mythos could exist in the real world, and chose to set the film during the second year of Batman's career rather than retell the character's origin story, as he wanted his take to be different from previous Batman films. He felt the film was "more about someone who hadn’t quite figured out why they were doing the thing they were doing" and wanted it to focus on Batman's emotional arc, in which "you see him go through tremendous trauma and then marshal the will to find a way through". Reeves originally intended for his version of The Batman to be set in the DCEU, but eventually decided that this would distract from Batman's character arc and asked Warner Bros. for the creative freedom to move outside of the shared universe. Reeves wanted to be able to create a version of Batman with a "personal aspect to it", and felt he should not be obligated to connect it to other aspects of the DCEU. Warner Bros.' incorporation of the multiverse in its DC productions allowed Reeves to take the project in his own direction; as a consequence, the film takes place in a separate world known as "Earth-2".

Reeves knew early on that the film would draw from Batman: The Long Halloween (1996–97) and its sequel Dark Victory (1999–2000) by Jeph Loeb and Tim Sale, featuring Batman hunting a serial killer who "would reveal this cooperation between the people who are legitimate pillars in the city and the criminal element in the city". He decided to use the Riddler after noting parallels between the character and the Zodiac Killer, a costumed serial killer who operated in California in the 1960s, while reading Mindhunter (1995). Reeves imagined that Batman's investigation would have him encounter other figures from the comic book mythos, leading to the introduction of characters like Catwoman, the Penguin, and Carmine Falcone. However, Reeves sought to ensure that Batman remained the story's focus, and tried to include him in every scene.

Reeves re-read his favorite Batman comics, but did not base the film on a specific storyline. Particular influence came from "Year One" (1987) by Frank Miller and David Mazzucchelli, Ego (2000) by Darwyn Cooke, and "Zero Year" (2013–14) by Scott Snyder and Greg Capullo, as well as Bob Kane, Bill Finger, and Neal Adams' runs on the character. Reeves drew from the depiction of a young, inexperienced Batman in "Year One", Catwoman's relationship to Falcone in The Long Halloween and Dark Victory, the exploration of Batman's psychology and his transition from exacting vengeance to inspiring hope in Ego, and the Riddler's plot to flood Gotham in "Zero Year". Other elements, such as Alfred's characterization, Thomas Wayne's mayoral campaign, and Martha Wayne being part of the Arkham family, came from Batman: Earth One (2012) by Geoff Johns and Gary Frank, while the theme of vengeance was inspired by Kevin Conroy's "I am vengeance, I am the night" speech from Batman: The Animated Series (1992–1999). The film also features references to other comic storylines, including "No Man's Land" (1999) and "Hush" (2002–03).

In portraying Bruce Wayne, Reeves wanted to depart from the traditional playboy and socialite; because he listened to the Nirvana song "Something in the Way" (1991) as he wrote the first act, he decided to base Bruce on reclusive Nirvana frontman Kurt Cobain. He took inspiration from the film Last Days (2005), which features a fictionalized version of Cobain living in a "decaying manor". The Godfather (1972) character Michael Corleone also influenced Reeves' take on Bruce. Reeves sought to make Batman relatable while honoring what people love about him, and described his Batman as "still trying to figure out how to do this, how to be effective, and he's not necessarily succeeding. He's broken and driven." Although it does not depict Batman's origin—in which he witnesses the murder of his parents—The Batman still explores the emotional cost that it has on the character, with Reeves stating Batman is "emotionally stunted at being 10 years old, because that's a trauma you don't get past".

Unlike previous Batman films, The Batman focuses on Batman's detective skills, with Reeves describing it as an "almost-noir driven, detective version of Batman" emphasizing the character's heart and mind. He said the film blended the detective, action, horror, and psychological thriller genres, which he felt hewed closer to the comics than previous adaptations had. He also felt this approach made it the most frightening Batman film. Reeves looked to films and filmmakers from the New Hollywood era for inspiration, including The French Connection (1971), Klute (1971), Chinatown (1974), All the President's Men (1976), and Taxi Driver (1976), as well as the works of Alfred Hitchcock and Wong Kar-wai's short film The Hand (2004). Chinatown and All the President's Men influenced The Batman depiction of a corrupt, decaying Gotham, while the relationship between Donald Sutherland and Jane Fonda's characters in Klute inspired the dynamic between Batman and Catwoman. Reeves said that he blended the inspirations to "inform the story, motivation, imagery, and tone" while also "conjur[ing] something... evocative and unique". To convey Batman's insecurity, Reeves added a scene, inspired by Manhunter (1986), featuring him visiting the Joker to profile the Riddler. Reeves also intended for the Joker's appearance to signify that Gotham's troubles would not end after the Riddler is captured.

The film contains a number of historical allusions, which Reeves felt would make it more believable. Two characters—Mayor Don Mitchell Jr. and District Attorney Gil Colson—share surnames with Watergate scandal figures John N. Mitchell and Charles Colson, and the Riddler's murder of Colson mirrors the death of Brian Wells. Additionally, Reeves based Falcone on Winter Hill Gang leader Whitey Bulger, citing the documentary Whitey: United States of America v. James J. Bulger (2014) as an influence; a number of plot elements mirror events from Bulger's life, including Falcone serving as an informant and bribing city officials.

Casting 

Robert Pattinson, Nicholas Hoult, Armie Hammer, and Aaron Taylor-Johnson were on the shortlist to replace Affleck as Batman, with Pattinson the frontrunner. Reeves wrote the script with Pattinson in mind after seeing his performance in Good Time (2017), but was unsure if he would be interested. Pattinson had eschewed major Hollywood franchise films since his work on the Twilight series (2008–2012), as he found those roles dull and wanted to avoid paparazzi attention. This meant he had not appeared in Marvel Studios' Marvel Cinematic Universe (MCU), which made him desirable to Warner Bros. The other major contender, Hoult, appeared in the Marvel Comics-based X-Men films, but those are separate from the MCU and Hoult was unrecognizable for much of them due to prosthetics and makeup.

Pattinson became interested in the role a year in advance and "kept obsessively checking up on it". A longtime Batman fan, he had ideas about how to bring a unique portrayal of the relationship between Batman's superhero activities and his identity as Bruce compared to previous film adaptations, and was interested in the character's lack of superpowers. Reeves spent hours reviewing Pattinson's and Hoult's previous work before meeting with them in April 2019. They were the only contenders for the role by May 20, and both flew to Burbank, California, for a screen test. Pattinson wore Val Kilmer's Batsuit from Batman Forever (1995) during his test since it was the only existing costume that fit him. The audition was challenging because the suit was small and difficult to move in, but Pattinson and Reeves found it a "transformative" experience. Pattinson was cast on May 31, with a salary of $3million.

Pattinson's casting was met with backlash from some Batman fans, with a Change.org petition calling to reverse the decision. Pattinson said he found the response less vitriolic than he had expected, and felt that being an underdog meant he did not have expectations to meet in his performance. Christian Bale, who played Batman in The Dark Knight Trilogy (2005–2012), supported Pattinson, encouraging him to "make [the role] his own" and ignore critics. Bale likened the fan revolt to the backlash that Heath Ledger experienced when he was cast as the Joker in The Dark Knight (2008). To prepare, Pattinson studied Batman's history, reading comics spanning from the Golden Age of Comic Books to writer Tom King's 2016–2019 run on Batman. He trained in Brazilian jiu-jitsu with instructor Rigan Machado, wanting to undergo physical change in a similar way to superhero actors like Chris Hemsworth, Dwayne Johnson, Robert Downey Jr., and Chris Evans. He received advice from the Dark Knight Trilogy director Christopher Nolan while working with him on Tenet (2020).

Jeffrey Wright is the first live-action actor of color to portray Gordon; he felt his casting reflected how diverse America has become since Batman's introduction in 1939, and said none of Gordon's qualities "require that he be white". In preparation, Wright read Batman comics, including The Long Halloween. He looked to Golden Age comics because he felt there was "long arc for Gordon from then until today", which inspired his performance. He also based his performance on police officer-turned-Mayor of New York City Eric Adams.

Jonah Hill initially entered negotiations to play either the Riddler or the Penguin, but exited negotiations after a month. According to Variety Justin Kroll, Hill wanted $10million—more than double the amount Pattinson would earn—while Kit reported that Warner Bros. and Hill could not decide which role he would take. Paul Dano was cast as the Riddler after Hill exited talks. To prepare, Dano researched serial killers and chose to read this material in public places since he found it disturbing and did not want to read it alone. He used the Beach Boys' founder Brian Wilson, whom he had portrayed in the 2014 biopic Love & Mercy, as the basis of his performance, and was also influenced by Nirvana's songs. Reeves himself wrote the Riddler's character with Dano's portrayal of Wilson in mind. Dano thought about the Riddler's motivations and the sense of power the character feels when wearing a mask, and worked with a mask expert to figure out how to approach the role in costume.

Zoë Kravitz was cast as Catwoman following a screen test with Pattinson; she had previously voiced the character in The Lego Batman Movie (2017). Casting director Cindy Tolan suggested Kravitz, and Reeves chose her over actresses such as Ana de Armas, Ella Balinska, and Eiza González, who also auditioned for the role, as well as Zazie Beetz, Alicia Vikander, Hannah John-Kamen, and Nathalie Emmanuel. Kravitz was reluctant to join another superhero film after working on X-Men: First Class (2011), but was a fan of the Catwoman character and felt "connected to her emotionally and also aesthetically"; she felt that her honesty with Reeves played a large part in her selection, and explained that she wanted Reeves to know what working with her would be like. She provided advice on how to develop Catwoman's character, and began training with instructor David Higgins two months before shooting. Kravitz also studied footage of cats and lions fighting to develop her movements while practicing with stunt coordinator Rob Alonzo. She drew inspiration from "Year One" and Michelle Pfeiffer's portrayal of Catwoman in Batman Returns (1992).

Reeves approached Andy Serkis regarding the role of Alfred during post-production on War for the Planet of the Apes, and he was eager to work with Reeves again. Colin Farrell and John Turturro were respectively cast as the Penguin and Carmine Falcone. Farrell looked to the Godfather character Fredo Corleone for inspiration and worked with dialect coach Jessica Drake to develop the Penguin's voice, while Turturro collaborated with his son Amadeo, who is an editor at DC Comics, and Reeves to develop Falcone and his mannerisms. Turturro drew inspiration from warnings his father gave him about the Mafia as a child growing up in New York City. Other cast members include Jayme Lawson, Peter Sarsgaard, Gil Perez-Abraham, twins Charlie and Max Carver, Rupert Penry-Jones, Jay Lycurgo, and Con O'Neill. Lycurgo, who portrays a criminal, shot his scenes a year before he joined the DC series Titans as Tim Drake.

Reeves was unsure if the Joker's appearance would be kept in the theatrical release, or if the actor playing him would be able to reprise the role in the future. Consequently, he felt the actor who played the Joker needed to be "fearless". Reeves met with Barry Keoghan, who was eager to take up the offer. The production team attempted to keep Keoghan's role a secret by announcing that he was portraying the "Year One" character Stanley Merkel when he was cast, but Keoghan's brother revealed the truth on social media ahead of the film's release.

Design

Sets and props 
The design team began working on the Batcave and Batmobile designs before the script was finished, as Reeves had a clear vision of what The Batman world would look like and wanted the three to reflect each other. The Batcave was based on the train station beneath New York's Waldorf Astoria Hotel and private underground railways in New York City that wealthy families used around the early 1900s. Reeves said this was a way to "root all these things in things that feel real, but also extraordinary". The Batcave, a partial set build on the Warner Bros. Studios, Leavesden, also serves as the foundation of the film's depiction of Wayne Manor, which Reeves described as decaying, representing Batman's uninterest in his family's wealth. The Gotham City Hall set was built in a hangar at Cardington Airfield; the hangar also had a soundproof room that was set up for Dano to record certain Riddler scenes. Eight blocks of Gotham were designed in Warner Bros. Studios, Leavesden.

Reeves and production designer James Chinlund envisioned a realistic Gotham City and drew inspiration from various locations, such as Chicago and Pittsburgh. During pre-production, Chinlund had designed virtual sets using VR headsets and showed them to Reeves and Fraser, which allowed them to plan for various logistics for filming in the actual sets depicted in the headsets. He had described it as allowing Reeves to storyboard "the whole film himself", with the shots being incorporated in the film. Reeves had used screengrabs from the headset for inspiration when storyboarding the Batmobile chase sequence, explaining "I set all of these shots basically beforehand, and we made this crazy storyboard that was made of screengrabs from VR, from the lenses we had found. And so it was an incredibly involved process". Fraser had also said that this had helped the crew plan the positions of the cameras, though he noted that "VR doesn’t give you the emotionality of lenses – it just gives you the mathematics of the field of view".

Chinlund took inspiration from David Fincher's films and blended several architectural styles together, such as those of buildings from the 1920s to 1940s. Since the failed economic revivals of Gotham left unfinished architecture, Chinlund "litter[ed] the skyline with these unfinished skyscrapers" to show the "grit up there". Wayne Tower, which serves as Wayne's mausoleum, was inspired by the Hearst Castle; he described it as baroque, Gothic, and ornate. The Iceberg Lounge's aesthetics were inspired by the works of Robert Moses. Fraser said that Gotham City was inspired by the depiction of cities from Chinatown and that of the New York City streets in Klute. While Fraser had chose a "broader palette, which skewed towards dour and gloom", Chinlund had chose to use a different color palette when designing Selina Kyle's residence in the red-light district. He was inspired by Wong Kar-Wai's films and called it a "romantic palette in some of those movies that we loved, like neon and a lot of colour from the light in the street. Our world is grim in a lot of places, and that was an environment where we could let some colour pop".

Reeves envisioned a grounded, handmade design for the Batmobile, with Chinlund and concept artist Ash Thorp designing the vehicle's engine to resemble a bat. Reeves wanted the Batmobile to feel like a "wild beast" and move away from the tank-like design popularized by Nolan's Dark Knight films in favor of one that looked like a muscle car. He looked to Stephen King's novel Christine (1983), which is about a car possessed by supernatural forces, for inspiration: "I liked the idea of the car itself as a horror figure, making an animalistic appearance to really scare the hell out of the people Batman's pursuing." Reeves and Chinlund wanted the Batmobile to feel like its own character, and Chinlund prioritized function which reflected Batman's "single-minded focus on the mission". Chinlund used a steel bumper for the frame, so Batman could "push his way through any obstacle", as well as the roof of a 1969 Dodge Charger; he left the back open since it did not require protection. Four Batmobile units were built, with the primary driving unit powered by a 650bhp Chevrolet V8 engine constructed from over 3000 machined parts, and the other units being equipped with gimbals, water dispensers, and an electronic version for usability. Another unit was built on a Tesla chassis for indoor and night shots.

Batsuit 
The Batsuit was designed by supervisor Dave Crossman and concept artist Glyn Dillon over the course of a year. The team took body scans of Pattinson's body while he was filming Tenet and used them in reference with concept arts drawn by Dillon. They printed out a rough copy of each element after refining it using digital software, before it was molded by supervising costume effects modeler Piere Bohmaned. Further modifications were made to each piece until Reeves examined the final suit for approval. The team created over 20 suits for use in filming. The cowl was printed after being sculpted digitally and was created from polyurethane rubber.

Reeves wanted the Batsuit to feel as if Batman used spare parts to create it on his own, and the production team sought to evoke the iconography of the comics and balance the Batsuit's darkness without making it difficult to see. Details like bloodstains, nicks, and ricochets from bullets were added, and the color was chosen after consultation with Reeves, cinematographer Greig Fraser, and the costume team. The team used different shades of dark gray for the body armor with some green and yellow coloring; Crossman noted that the grays allowed Batman to be more visible. Batman's utility belt was changed from yellow to black since the team felt it was more practical and realistic. The design team looked to tactical gear from the Vietnam War for inspiration. Particular inspiration came from Lee Bermejo's art in comics like Noël (2011) and Damned (2018–19), as Reeves was impressed by Bermejo's riot gear-esque design while reading Damned, which he felt suited the realistic tone. Bermejo was not consulted regarding the design, but was proud to see a Batsuit similar to his in a film. A port was added towards the end of filming for a scene in which Batman injects himself with adrenaline.

The Batsuit was designed with two pillars: first, it needed to "look the part", balancing light and dark while not detracting from Pattinson's emotion. Second, it had to be flexible; Pattinson wanted to be able to move and fight in it, inspired by the depiction of Batman in the Batman: Legends of the Dark Knight storyline "Shaman" (1989) by O'Neil and Edward Hannigan. Pattinson also asked Bale for advice during the design process, and he jokingly advised to "make sure you're gonna be able to relieve yourself" while wearing the suit. The final suit is more flexible than previous Batsuits, to the point that Pattinson "immediately started doing somersaults in it just because you could" when he put on the first prototype.

The cowl was intended to resemble leather; the stitching around the forehead and the nose patches were influenced by Adam West's costume from the 1960s Batman television series. Dillon added that he wanted Batman to feel like the "Grim Reaper" with a skull-like cowl. The cape was created using artificial Japanese leather, as it was impractical to use real leather due to its weight. Batman's wingsuit was created by a Seattle-based wingsuit company using the Batsuit material. The boots were inspired from Austrian combat boots while Ian Jones, the costume prop maker, added a leather gator on top to embellish fight scenes and scenes when Batman rides a motorbike. A special port was also added to the Batsuit towards the end of filming by the costume prop department to aid a scene in which Batman injects himself with adrenaline. Batman's grapple gun, which can slide out via a hidden contraption in his arm, was influenced by Travis Bickle's gun from Taxi Driver (1976). The bat symbol on his chest also serves as a knife; Dillon felt it was unrealistic for the symbol to be leather, so the team decided to make it a weapon.

Other costumes 
Costume design was led by Jacqueline Durran. Makeup artist Maria Donne modeled Bruce Wayne's hairstyle after Cobain, while his eyeliner when suiting up as Batman featured a mix of pigments and products that would sustain rain and sweating.

To portray the Penguin, Farrell wore prosthetics and a fat suit created by makeup artist Mike Marino. Reeves described it as "almost like a throwback Warner Bros. gangster" similar to actors John Cazale, Sydney Greenstreet, and Bob Hoskins. Farrell chose to wear a fat suit over gaining weight because he had suffered health problems when he gained weight for the television series The North Water (2021). Farrell's costume does not feature the Penguin's traditional monocle and top hat, and Warner Bros. disallowed him from smoking tobacco as he does in the comics. Farrell fought to allow him to carry a cigar instead of cigarettes, but Warner Bros. would not relent. Farrell was frequently described as "unrecognizable" in costume, to the point that Wright and Penry-Jones initially did not recognize him on set. Reeves was hesitant to make Farrell unrecognizable, as he wanted the Penguin's design to reflect the realistic tone, but accepted the design after seeing makeup tests. It took between two and four hours to apply the prosthetics, and Farrell tested the costume at a Burbank Starbucks where he "got a couple of stares" ordering a latte in-character. He described wearing the costume as "absolute liberation", adding, "When the piece moves as well as the piece that was designed for the Penguin moved, my eyebrows moved to my cheeks and my smile, it was fucking insane. I didn't have any fear that Colin could be seen through."

The Riddler's costume was based on sketches of the Zodiac Killer; it retains the character's traditional green coat while adding a combat mask, which Dano wanted to show that the Riddler "probably felt a lot of shame or self-hatred or pain". Dano also covered himself in plastic wrap since he felt the Riddler would take extreme precautions to avoid leaving DNA at crime scenes. He became concerned about the effect this costume was having on him during filming since his head was "throbbing with heat... It was like compressed from the sweat and the heat and the lack of oxygen." Catwoman's costume was designed to lay a foundation for what would become her comic book outfit while feeling "as practical as possible". Marino also designed the facial prosthetics that Keoghan used to portray the Joker; although the Joker only appears in silhouette in the final cut, Reeves still had Marino develop a full design. Reeves wanted him to resemble Conrad Veidt's The Man Who Laughs (1928) character Gwynplaine that inspired the Joker's original portrayal in the comics. Reeves made the Joker's perpetual grin the result of a biological condition, rather than a facial scar as in previous films, to distinguish the new incarnation.

Filming 

Principal photography began in January 2020 in London, under the working title Vengeance, and wrapped on March 21, 2021. Second unit filming took place in December 2019. Greig Fraser served as cinematographer; he previously worked with Reeves on Let Me In (2010). Cemetery scenes were filmed at the Glasgow Necropolis in Scotland in mid-February 2020, before relocating to Liverpool in March. Filming in London took place at the O2 Arena, Printworks nightclub, Kingsway tramway subway, the Two Temple Place, the Somerset House, and areas near the River Thames. Filming in Liverpool took place at St George's Hall, Anfield Cemetery, Walker Art Gallery, Wellington Square, County Sessions House, and the Royal Liver Building. One scene was filmed at the abandoned Hartwood Hospital in Shotts, Scotland, while some exterior shots and stunts were filmed in Chicago.

Fraser used digital capture on Arri Alexa LF cameras, with custom ALFA anamorphic lenses. Fraser cited cinematographer Gordon Willis' lighting work on Klute, The Godfather, and All the Presidents' Men, as well as photographer Todd Hido, as inspiration, and at Reeves' suggestion attempted to convey the film from Batman's point of view. He described shooting the film as "one of the most challenging lighting jobs I've ever done"; filming Pattinson in the Batsuit was particularly difficult since he did not want shadows to obscure the costume's details. Pattinson broke his wrist performing a stunt towards the beginning of production, and described feeling "very much alone" while filming due to the insular nature of nighttime filming and his inability to take off his costume off-set.

Reeves was a meticulous director and described The Batman as "the most intricate narrative I have ever, ever tried to tackle". Pattinson said Reeves asked for many retakes and adjusting to such an approach took some time. Kravitz described Reeves as "the most specific person and director I've ever worked with", citing a particular instance in which he told her not to close her mouth since he thought it needed to be open to convey a certain emotion. Reeves showed the different takes to the actors after filming to illustrate the "make-or-break nuances" he had seen. One scene, in which Batman and the Riddler communicate via videotelephony, took over 200 takes. Pattinson guessed that Reeves was "editing the entire movie, every single take", which Reeves said was correct and not something that other actors he had worked with had observed. Reeves developed this style of filming, in which he spent more time on fewer angles, while directing the television series Felicity.

For fight scenes, Reeves wanted to depart from the "kinetic, quick-cutting" sequences that previous Batman directors like Tim Burton and Nolan had shot. He wanted viewers to "actually see what's happening... in a way that is utterly convincing". The Batmobile chase scene's cinematography was inspired by the car chase scene in The French Connection. Reeves originally planned to film the scene on a Liverpool freeway, but instead filmed it at the Dunsfold Aerodrome after determining that a race track would allow for more control. Parts were also filmed at the Coryton Refinery. A camera car with a 360-degree "hydra"-like rig attached was used to capture background plate shots. The shot in which the Batmobile jumps through the fire was done practically, though the fireballs were enhanced in post-production. The interior shots of the Penguin's car rolling were achieved with a rotisserie rig on a rotating gimbal attached to the car that Farrell was in. To convey the chase from Batman's perspective, Fraser attached "cameras to cars and motorbikes, even though it was technically really hard to do... We fought against logistics. We fought against time. We fought against everything that told us to not do it that way." Fraser used different camera lenses and covered them in silicone to simulate rain and dirt and immerse the viewer.

Industrial Light & Magic (ILM) provided the StageCraft virtual production technology that Fraser helped develop on the Disney+ Star Wars series The Mandalorian, with a wall of LED panels allowing visual effects backgrounds to be rendered in real-time via Unreal Engine 4. The wall was built around existing practical sets; it was used for scenes involving the abandoned skyscraper where the Bat-Signal is stationed so Reeves and Fraser could film with consistent golden hour lighting, which is difficult when shooting on-location. Using virtual production also meant the lighting impacted on the actors and set in a way that green screen technology could not. Reeves was inspired by the lighting from In the Mood for Love (2000). The production team only had a few weeks to shoot the scenes.

Reeves filmed fake scenes with Keoghan portraying Merkel to prevent his actual role from leaking, and during the actual Joker scenes, Reeves kept Keoghan's face out of focus to signify that the Joker was still in his formative stages. The production team briefly discussed removing the subplot in which the Riddler's online followers attempt to assassinate Bella Reál due to its similarities to the 2021 United States Capitol attack, which occurred during the final months of filming, but Reeves decided it was too integral to the story and different enough from the attack.

COVID-19 pandemic 
Production was disrupted by the COVID-19 pandemic, beginning two months after filming started. When the pandemic began, Warner Bros. did not plan to suspend shooting, unlike other major studios. However, it eventually did so on March 14, 2020. Warner Bros. stated that the hiatus would just be for two weeks, but Reeves announced on March 25 that filming had been suspended indefinitely. Production was unlikely to restart until at least mid-May, and in April, Warner Bros. pushed the release date back to October 1, 2021. On April 1, the production's dialect coach, Andrew Jack, died of complications from COVID-19.

Around a quarter of filming was completed before the suspension, and Reeves began looking over that footage to help plan for the rest of filming. Reeves did not rewrite the script, but used the time to explore the film's tone. On May 12, the UK government said high-end film productions could resume shooting as soon as employers put COVID-19 safety measures in place. A month later, The Batman was given permission to restart production in July at the earliest. Clark said Jack's death haunted the crew as they prepared to resume production. By September 3, filming had resumed for three days at Warner Bros. Studios, Leavesden, only to be put on pause again after Pattinson tested positive for COVID-19. The filming crew then entered a two-week quarantine, after which filming was set to resume, while construction on the sets and props at Leavesden Studios continued. Following this, Reeves became concerned that he would be unable to finish the film if he contracted COVID-19, so he wore a mask, scuba goggles, and a head covering on set. Pattinson stated that approximately 90% of the film was shot in the studio.

Filming resumed on September 17, after Pattinson was cleared to return to set. At this point, the film had approximately three more months of filming and was expected to finish by the end of 2020. Filming was limited to England, and crew members were required to live close to the production area and not leave the surrounding community until production ended. Pattinson compared filming during the pandemic to a "military operation. We had earpieces in to have direction a lot of the time to kind of limit the amount of interactions." Some scenes were filmed using a remote control camera, which Pattinson found strange since he could not tell if there were any crew members around. Kravitz added that production became "impersonal" since mask mandates and other precautions meant the crew could not interact much. In early October, the film's release was pushed to March 4, 2022, due to the production delays. Certain Riddler scenes, such as the interrogation scene, were originally intended to be filmed towards the end of production, but were filmed early due to the pandemic.

Editing 
The Batmobile chase was the first scene that sound editor Will Files worked on, and he used a bottle rocket sound effect as the basis for how the car sounded. Files worked with Douglas Murray and Andy Nelson to complete the sequence. The Batmobile's main engine noise came from a Ford big block engine, while the supercharger sound effect was a reversed World War II Jeep recording.

Warner Bros. held test screenings in late 2021; some early screenings showed a four-hour-long cut. Test audiences were not told they were seeing The Batman until entering the theater. The first cut was longer than Reeves intended, and he described it as rough, saying, "I was not all the way through the cut of the movie. There was so much of the movie yet to be touched". Reeves was "terrified" going into the first test screening, but was relieved when test audiences enjoyed the complex narrative. He felt it "kind of validated that this was a direction that an audience would be excited about", and future test screenings were met with improving reception. Reeves "made [his] way, bit by bit through the cut and [made] tiny adjustments to make sure that little things that maybe [were] not clear enough [were] clearer". Later test screenings showed two cuts, with an unknown actor, possibly Keoghan, included in only one. The final screening took place during the week beginning November 29, after which Warner Bros. executives decided which cut they preferred. Reeves kept the penultimate scene—in which the Joker befriends the Riddler in Arkham—because he felt it heightened the stakes of Batman and Catwoman's final conversation while completing the Riddler's story arc, but he cut the Manhunter-inspired scene for being unnecessary and disrupting the pacing. The final cut runs at 176 minutes including credits, making The Batman the longest Batman film and the third-longest superhero film after Zack Snyder's Justice League and Avengers: Endgame (2019).

In January 2022, The Batman received a PG-13 rating from the Motion Picture Association, despite wide speculation and internal discussions at Warner Bros. that its somber tone and violent content would lead to it being the first theatrical Batman film with an R-rating. The film was able to receive a PG-13 rating because it does not include excessive profanity or nudity. Rebecca Rubin of Variety opined that an R-rating could have hurt the film's box office potential by preventing many young males from seeing it, noting that the two previous R-rated DC films, Birds of Prey (2020) and The Suicide Squad (2021), both underperformed commercially. Reeves said that he always intended to make The Batman PG-13 and that there was not an alternate R-rated cut. He added that a PG-13 rating was one of the only studio mandates he faced.

Visual effects 
Dan Lemmon served as the visual effects supervisor, after previously collaborating with Reeves on the Planet of the Apes films. Visual effects vendors included Wētā FX, ILM, Scanline VFX, and Crafty Apes, with over 1,500 visual effects shots created on a $20 million budget. According to Lemmon, "ILM led the work on Gotham, and their StageCraft group handled the real-time LED backgrounds during production. Scanline VFX took on most of the third act and the heavy simulation work. Wētā FX did the Batmobile chase and a few other standalone environments. And then Crafty Apes did a substantial amount of our 2D work, with splits, retimes, stabilizations, monitors and other cleanup work".

Chinland designed the Gotham cityscape so it could be created digitally by ILM and displayed in the background of scenes using the StageCraft technology. He used plate shots from London, New York, and Chicago; according to Lemmon, Reeves wanted the cityscapes to capture the "forms, architecture, and the fabric of the city to look like it was really in decay." Chinland originated the idea to place the Bat-Signal on an abandoned building rather than on top of the GCPD building. Due to the COVID-19 pandemic, a majority of the buildings were created using computer generated imagery (CGI). Lemmon stated that using Unreal Engine to render the LED-walls in real time helped the team plan out the logistics for filming various scenes, such as "how big the sets needed to be, where process screens would go, what the extensions would look like through the camera, where stunt rigging and special effects equipment would go", while also allowing Fraser to adjust the lighting. Portable LED screens showing advertisements were used when filming scenes in Gotham Square to augment the lighting of the jumbotrons in post.

Wētā FX created over 320 VFX shots for the film. They had begun contacting Lemmon and Warner Bros. about working on the film by the middle of 2019. Anders Langlands, the visual effects supervisor for Wētā, had already travelled to the UK by December 2019 to see pre-production work. While they were initially planned to be on set during filming, this did not happen due to the COVID-19 pandemic. Langlands had said that Wētā had worked on the film for over a year and that the team had managed to do "great job in getting everybody set up for that very quickly and it was actually a very, very smooth transition".  For the Batmobile chase sequence, four vehicles were constructed by The Batman special effects supervisor Dominic Tuohy, two of which could be driven via remote control, and portions of the scene were shot practically. Wētā was then tasked with fleshing out that sequence, using CGI to add rain and vehicles and helping form the "beats" of the chase, such as when the Penguin causes a fuel truck explosion. One of Wētā's biggest tasks was replicating Fraser's lighting, which they performed using the Manuka renderer and virtual cinematography. The team also bought glass plates and silicone sealants to replicate Fraser's process of inserting silicone on the lenses. Furthermore, the team, including the compositing staff members Peter Hillman, Ben Morgan, and Beck Veitch, also had upgraded their tools that performed deepfocus effects, which allowed them to emulate the way bokeh and optical vignetting resulted from Fraser's camera lens.

The team had difficulty inserting rain in the Batmobile chase due to the physics and oscillation of rain in real life, which they wanted to replicate. They began by creating a rain primitive to adjust the speed and phases of the rain oscillation, while supervisor Christos Parliarnos set the primitive on the Houdini particle system to animate the rain speed. The team also created an adjustable car rig for the camera team to track, which they called the "clown car". The camera team could adjust the headlights and wheels, which allowed the VFX team to have an accurate 3D model for every car being used, thus facilitating inserting additional cars to pre-existing plates. Other CG parts of the scene included the collision of the Batmobile with the Penguin's car and Batman's cape and boots. Wētā also designed the entrance of the Batcave to accommodate shots of Bruce's motorcycle; Reeves could not film the scenes due to the size of the sets. They digitally created the space using models provided by the art department and plate shots; it sought to emulate Fraser's lighting, drew inspiration from the Tribune Tower, and inserted bats. Additionally, Wētā used CG to create the higher balcony and windows for the City Hall set, as the practical set ended at the first balcony. The team experienced difficulty compositing the CGI architecture with the practical due to the distortion and focus falloff caused by the lenses. In fight scenes, the team replaced stunt double Rick English's face with Pattinson's using paintings and facial animations.

Scanline VFX created over 217 VFX shots across 11 sequences. It was responsible for creating the destruction of the water dams, the subsequent tsunami rushing towards Gotham Square Gardens, and Catwoman's burglary. For the burglary, the team used digital doubles for Pattinson and Kravitz and facial replacements for footage filmed with stunt doubles. A CGI arena was created for the Gardens so that cameras could be placed anywhere on set; its exterior was based on scans and plate shots of exterior locations in Chicago and the Madison Square Garden, while the ground level and entrance were based the O2 Arena. The overall arena set was the only one that used blue screens, with principal photography from O2 being used to create the backgrounds. Simulations were used to replicate water, architectural destruction, fire, smoke, and electric arcing for the final act, with Houdini being used for rigid body simulations and Flowline for water simulations. The artists began by creating low-resolution simulations, with footage of tsunamis being used as reference, and progressively animated it faster. They did not have to adjust the lighting too much, and mainly focused on color-correcting the water. Practical explosions were modified with CGI, while other modifications included environmental interactions, such as fire lighting, smoke, and shockwaves generating dust and dirt. Rendering glass during the explosion of the Gotham Square Gardens roof was difficult due to the "pings, reflections, and refractions", while scenes involving arcing electricity from disconnected cables and rafter beams from the interior of Gotham Square Gardens also required "significant art direction". The team also performed set extensions from practical sets and reconstructed it using plate photography for action scenes located in the rafters. They also used Eyeline Studios' volumetric capture tools to replace the stunt doubles' faces. Additional setups were created to match Fraser's process of inserting caulk on the lenses, while crowds were inserted using CGI.

Music 

In October 2019, Reeves announced that his frequent collaborator Michael Giacchino would be composing the film's score. Later that month, Giacchino said he had already finished writing the main theme for the film because he was so excited to do so; because this music was written much earlier in the production than is usual for a film, Giacchino and Reeves were able to use it in promotional materials. Giacchino said he felt total freedom to write the music that he wanted for the film, agreeing with Reeves that this was their vision of Batman similar to how different comic book and graphic novel authors and artists over the years had been able to create different takes on the character. Giacchino completed the score in October 2021, and his main theme was released as a single on January 21, 2022. Giacchino's theme for the Riddler was released as a single on February 4, and his Catwoman theme was released as the third and final single on February 17. The full soundtrack album was released on February 25. "Something in the Way" appears twice in the film, and was noted to have a similar baseline to Giacchino's score. He acknowledged this, but said it was a lucky coincidence. "Ave Maria" by Franz Schubert is also featured and was performed by the Tiffin Boys' Choir and Dano.

Marketing 
Reeves released "moody, red-saturated" test footage of Pattinson in his Batman costume on February 13, 2020. The footage included early music written by Giacchino, and generated discussion about the film's approach to Batman. Chris Evangelista of /Film thought Pattinson's Batman looked much different from previous film depictions, while Richard Newby of The Hollywood Reporter identified the costume's various references to past incarnations. Newby also noted that the bat emblem on the costume's chest resembled a pistol, and wondered if it was the pistol used to kill Batman's parents in his origin story. The footage's use of the color red also led to discussion of how The Batman would differ tonally from previous adaptations. On March 4, Reeves released an image of the film's Batmobile. Dino-Ray Ramos of Deadline Hollywood opined that it seemed "sexier and more streamlined than Batmobiles from the past", giving off "James Bond-meets-Fast and Furious energy" that seemed appropriate for Pattinson's version of the character.

Reeves debuted a teaser trailer during the virtual DC FanDome event on August 22, featuring a remix of the Nirvana song "Something in the Way" (1991) combined with Giacchino's score. The trailer received 34 million views within 24 hours, and according to CNET Bonnie Burton and Jennifer Bisset it "set the internet on fire". They noted its somber, grim tone. Katrina Nattress of Spin and John Saavedra at Den of Geek respectively described its depiction of Gotham City as "dystopic" and "nightmarish". Adam Chitwood of Collider praised what he saw as a "genuinely refreshing" approach to depicting the world of Batman, and Saavedra wrote that it made The Batman look more like a detective story than a superhero film. Alex Abad-Santos of Vox felt the film had more in common with the R-rated Batman spin-off Joker (2019) than other contemporary DC films. Abad-Santos also noted that some critics disliked the trailer's dark tone, as previous Batman films were similarly dark and "some aren't in the mood to watch all that darkness over again", but felt The Batman could show that "carte-blanche reactionary violence, retribution rewarded with material wealth, and a soulless existence driven by bloody, bone-snapping ambition isn't actually something regular people want to emulate".

Reeves and Pattinson discussed the film at the Warner Bros. CinemaCon panel on August 24, 2021, where a sizzle reel of new footage was shown. Reeves, Pattinson, and Kravitz debuted a second trailer as the finale of DC FanDome on October 16. Daniel Chin at The Ringer said the trailer had been a highly anticipated part of the virtual event, and felt it did not disappoint. He and other commentators highlighted the trailer's dark, violent, and brutal approach to the character, which Chin felt was consistent with the teaser trailer. Adam B. Vary of Variety specifically compared the tone to Christoper Nolan's "gritty" Dark Knight films, believing The Batman would be darker and more violent than even those films. Vary, Chin, and Entertainment Weekly Chancellor Agard all highlighted the trailer's footage of Farrell and his physical transformation for the role of Penguin. A Japanese trailer released on December 12 quickly led to discussion and speculation that the Joker would appear after fans spotted a figure resembling the character on a newspaper prop in the footage.

Warner Bros. launched a viral marketing campaign in December 2021 with the website www.rataalada.com (Rata alada is Spanish for "winged rat"). The website allows users to engage in simulated conversations with the Riddler, and solving his riddles unlocks promotional artwork. The final reward for the website was the deleted scene where Batman meets with Keoghan's Joker in Arkham. A third trailer, titled "The Bat and the Cat", was released on December 27 and focuses on the relationship between Batman and Catwoman. /Film Jeremy Mathai already felt the film's marketing had been great and was impressed that this was "yet another incredible trailer". Asha Barbaschow and Rob Bricken of Gizmodo opined that Pattinson looked like a better Batman than his predecessors, Bale and Affleck. They were intrigued by the trailer's implication that the Riddler would position himself as an "agent of justice" and were excited at the prospect of Reeves altering Batman's origin story. In February 2022, more footage from the film was released as part of a teaser for Warner Bros.' 2022 slate of DC films, which at that time included Black Adam, The Flash, and Aquaman and the Lost Kingdom.

WarnerMedia spent over $28 million on television advertisements and licensed a significant amount of merchandise to promote the film; it described the promotion as the largest Batman merchandise collection in a decade. Promotion included Hot Wheels toys from Mattel, Lego sets, action figures from McFarlane Toys and Funko, clothing, cosmetics, and Oreo cookies. Warner Bros. partnered with Universal Pictures and the Supercars Championship to adorn a livery inspired by The Batman on the Ford Mustang GT Course Car, while Google, independently from Warner Bros., updated Google Search to display a Bat-Signal Easter egg for Batman-related search queries in February 2022. Warner Bros. Consumer Products and DC Comics partnered with Puma to release a collection of products like footwear, accessories, and apparels featuring Batman, the Batmobile, and Bat emblem. DC Comics published The Batman Box Set, a trade paperback collection featuring a slipcase with art by Jim Lee and the "Year One", The Long Halloween, and Ego comics, in March 2022. Additionally, most of DC's March 2022 Batman-related comics feature variant covers based on the film.

Release

Theatrical 
Special screenings were held in Paris on February 21, 2022, and London on February 23, 2022. The Batman world premiere was held at Lincoln Center in New York City on March 1, 2022, alongside 350 advance IMAX screenings across the United States, ahead of its wide release by Warner Bros. Pictures on March 4. It was originally set for release on June 25, 2021, before it was pushed back to October 1, 2021, and then to March 2022, both times after Warner Bros. adjusted its release schedule due to the COVID-19 pandemic.

The Batman was the first superhero film to be released in China since Wonder Woman 1984 (2020), after multiple Marvel films were denied releases in 2021. Warner Bros. canceled the Russian release in response to the Russian invasion of Ukraine in February 2022.

Home media 
The Batman was released for digital download, as well as to stream on HBO Max, on April 18, 2022, a day earlier than announced. It became the first Warner Bros. distributed film in over a year that did not stream on HBO Max simultaneously with its theatrical release. The film's linear television premiere was on HBO on April 23, followed by physical release on Ultra HD Blu-ray, Blu-ray, and DVD by Warner Bros. Home Entertainment on May 24.

According to Samba TV, the film was streamed by 720,000 American households during its first day of release on HBO Max. It also had the most successful premiere for any film on HBO Max in Latin America. Samba TV reported that by the end of its first week, the movie had been watched by 4.1 million American households. This was higher than the viewership for nearly all day-and-date films released on HBO Max and the second best for a film on the platform during the first week of release, behind Mortal Kombat (2021), which had a viewership of 4.3 million households.

Reception

Box office 
The Batman grossed $369.3million in the United States and Canada, and $401.6million in other territories, for a worldwide total of $770.9million. It is the seventh-highest-grossing film of 2022, as well as the highest-grossing serial killer film. The film's IMAX performance helped raise its overall first quarter revenues ($60 million) by 55% and its global box office ($173.2 million) by 57% from the same period in 2021.

In the US and Canada, The Batman was projected to gross $115–170 million from 4,417 theaters in its opening weekend, and around $330–475 million for its total domestic box office. Tickets for the advance IMAX screenings sold out within a day of going on sale on February 8, 2022. The film made $57 million on its first day in the US and Canada, which included $17.6 million from Thursday night previews and $4 million from Tuesday and Wednesday advanced screenings. It grossed $134 million in its opening weekend, becoming the second pandemic-era film to gross over $100 million in the US and Canada in its opening weekend, after Spider-Man: No Way Home (2021). It also became Warner Bros.' highest-grossing pandemic-era film domestically in just three days. More than 65% of the audience in the opening weekend was male, while more than 60% were in the age range of 18–34 years old. The film grossed $66.5 million in its second weekend, dropping 50% and staying atop the box office. The third weekend saw it gross $36.7 million, a fall of 45%, while also making it the second film in the pandemic era to make more than $300 million in the US and Canada. In the fourth weekend it was displaced to the second spot by The Lost City, earning $20.5 million for a drop of 44%.

In South Korea, The Batman opened to $1.7 million, the biggest opening in the country in 2022. Through March 2, it had earned $5.3 million across eight countries. In France, it earned $2.1 million, the highest opening for 2022. Through March 4, it had made an estimated $54 million in 74 countries outside the US and Canada. In the United Kingdom it opened to $6.4 million, the second-highest opening in the country during the pandemic. It had the second-highest pandemic opening in Spain as well, earning $1.2 million. It grossed around $124.2 million by the end of the week in 74 countries outside the US and Canada, and ranked first in 73 of them during the weekend. It earned $22.3 million globally in IMAX theatres, the second-highest opening weekend for the chain since December 2019. This was also the highest opening for a movie outside the US and Canada in 2022, the highest for Warner in the pandemic era, as well as the third biggest overall during the pandemic. In addition, it had the second-highest opening weekend of the pandemic era in sixteen countries including the UK ($18.1 million), Mexico ($12.1 million), Australia ($9.3 million), Brazil ($8.8 million), France ($8.4 million), Germany ($5.1 million), South Korea ($4.4 million), Italy ($4.1 million), Spain ($3.7 million), and India ($3.4 million). It also earned the biggest opening weekend for Warner Bros. in 62 countries during the pandemic and its biggest-ever opening weekend in seven countries.

The film earned $66.6 million from 76 markets other than the US and Canada in its sophomore weekend for a drop of 42%, including a $3.2 million opening in Japan. The film reached the $500 million-milestone on March 17, becoming the eighth pandemic-era film to do so, while also becoming Warner Bros.' highest-grossing film during the pandemic-era. In its third weekend, it made $49.1 million in countries other than the US and Canada, a drop of 46%. In China, it opened to a $11.8 million weekend according to Artisan Gateway while 30–43% of the theaters were closed, the best opening in the country for an American film in 2022, acquiring the top position at the box office. It grossed $25.3 million during the fourth weekend for a fall of 49%, including $3.1 million in China, where it was displaced by Moonfall. It crossed the $750 million-milestone on April 17, becoming the fifth pandemic-era film to do so, with the largest running-total countries being the UK ($53.2 million), Mexico ($30.7 million), Australia ($27 million), France ($25.9 million), Brazil ($22.6 million), China ($22.5 million), Germany ($18.9 million), Spain ($11.8 million), Italy ($11.2 million), and Japan ($10 million).

Critical response 
The site's critical consensus reads, "A grim, gritty, and gripping super-noir, The Batman ranks among the Dark Knight's bleakest – and most thrillingly ambitious – live-action outings." Audiences polled by CinemaScore gave the film an average grade of "A–" on an A+ to F scale, while those at PostTrak gave it an 87% positive score (with an average 4.5 out of 5 stars), with 71% saying they would definitely recommend it.

IGN contributor Alex Stedman gave a 10 out of 10 rating, writing, "The Batman is a gripping, gorgeous, and at times genuinely scary psychological crime thriller that gives Bruce Wayne the grounded detective story he deserves." Adam Nayman of The Ringer gave the film a mostly positive review, but criticized some aspects of the film, particularly the final act, however, he stated that "The Batman is the Batman movie we deserve, though: overwrought and overlong, but also carefully crafted and exhilarating. It’s just good enough to wish it were better—a lavish piece of intellectual property that ultimately prices itself out of providing cheap thrills." Writing for The National, Jason Mottram called the film "one of the darkest and most compelling comic-book movies of the modern era" while praising the performances, action sequences and story. Digital Spy reviewer Ian Sandwell praised the performances and felt that "It's easy to get Batman wrong, but Reeves never even threatens to do so. The Batman is an enthralling, chilling and fresh new take on the iconic DC hero that'll leave you desperate for another visit to this impeccably-crafted world." Clarisse Loughrey of The Independent gave the film a rating of 4/5 and wrote "Matt Reeves's take on the Caped Crusader may not be a genre-defining miracle, but it delivers a tapered-down, intimate portrait, while Zoe Kravitz's Catwoman brings an almost-extinct sensuality to the role". From The Hollywood Reporter, David Rooney praised the film for being unique and stated that "this ambitious reboot is grounded in a contemporary reality where institutional and political distrust breeds unhinged vigilantism," but felt that "Reeves’ film hammers home the realization that somewhere along the line, someone – probably Christopher Nolan – decided that Batman movies should no longer be fun." Peter Debruge at Variety also praised the film, highlighting the film's grounded and noir take on Batman, and praised the film for "its willingness to dismantle and interrogate the very concept of superheroes." Alex Abad-Santos of Vox gave the film a positive review, and wrote the film "realizes the character's greatness in a classic noir detective story" and that the film "enriches Batman's legacy, complicating it by trusting its audience to interrogate his heroism and eventually ponder what makes Batman a hero – or if he's even a hero at all."

Peter Bradshaw of The Guardian, praised the performances but felt that "Inevitably, night falls on the latest Batman iteration with the cloudy sense that – of course – nothing has really been at stake." Richard Brody at The New Yorker gave a more critical review, praising the first two hours of the film and the "intricacy of the movie’s intertwined plots," but ultimately criticized the characters, as he felt that they were "reduced to a handful of traits and a backstory, defined solely by their function in the plot." Ann Hornaday from The Washington Post rated the film 1.5 out of 4 stars, criticizing the film for its dark visuals and its lengthy runtime, calling it "yet another lugubrious, laboriously grim slog masquerading as a fun comic book movie." Similarly, A. O. Scott of The New York Times also criticized the film for its dark visuals, in addition to saying the film has too much exposition, but praised the performances from the cast and Giacchino's score, and ultimately concluded by stating "I can’t say I had a good time, but I did end up somewhere I didn’t expect to be: looking forward to the next chapter." Mick LaSalle of the San Francisco Chronicle also gave a negative review, criticizing the film for its political commentary, drawing comparisons to that of Joker (2019), but he also praised some of the performances. Writing for Sight and Sound, Kim Newman gave an unenthusiastic review, criticizing the film's length, and felt the secondary characters, such as Lt. Gordon, Selina Kyle, Alfred, and Penguin, were underdeveloped and "subordinate to the case", though he praised Pattinson's performance and the detective-oriented Batman.

Accolades

Thematic analysis

Class conflict and inequality 
Class conflict is a central concept featured in The Batman, with Marco Vito Oddo of Collider asserting that the main theme is social inequality. Three of the primary characters—Batman, the Riddler, and Catwoman—are orphans from different economic backgrounds. Whereas Batman grew up in privilege, the Riddler only knew torment, while Catwoman experienced hardship. The Riddler's frustration with his upbringing leads to him lashing out against the wealthy, reflecting that criminality is born from desperation. JM Mutore of The A.V. Club and Susana Polo of Polygon said the Riddler falls into "the trap of villains who are right", opining that he is correct to expose corruption that has harmed the unfortunate. Chrishaun Baker of Inverse added that the film never frames the Riddler's frustration as wrong, though Brandon Zachary of Comic Book Resources argued that the Riddler is "inherently wrong" to think that change can be achieved through violence even if his motivations are understandable.

Zachary wrote that Batman, Catwoman, and the Riddler's upbringings give each character a different worldview: Batman's is narrow and binary, the Riddler adopts a "bitter and cruel" method to fight corruption that harms innocents, and Catwoman acknowledges the corrupting power of wealth but only becomes violent when her friends are harmed. The film draws parallels between the three characters, reflecting a popular notion that Batman is similar to his adversaries. Adam Nayman of The Ringer felt the film highlighted the themes of duality between Batman and his foes, and opined that Batman and the Riddler feel like "secret siblings" rather than "two different case studies in forlorn orphan psychology". Catwoman and the Riddler make Batman realize that poverty and inequality are the roots of Gotham's troubles, and inspire him to become an agent of hope and use his wealth to prevent social inequality. Baker wrote that the film ends with Batman realizing he "has to fight for the will of the people, amongst the people, against the very same institutions that make hollow promises to protect them".

Depiction of Batman 
Baker said that previous Batman films tend to reflect right-wing themes, with Tim Burton and Christopher Nolan's adaptations respectively featuring libertarian and "vaguely authoritarian" depictions of Batman. The Batman departs by questioning Batman's ethics and focusing on his material wealth. The film highlights that Batman's wealth does not alleviate his suffering and explores the idea that he should be more philanthropic; initially, Batman does not realize he is taking his wealth for granted and could be using it to help Gotham. Mutore felt The Batman was more direct in addressing the issue than previous Batman films, but "circumvents this argument" by portraying Thomas Wayne's attempt at philanthropy as only leading to corruption, while Baker felt the film directly addresses the issue by having progressive mayoral candidate Bella Réal confront Bruce about his wealth. Conversely, Nayman argued the film does not focus on his class as much as previous films did, as he is depicted as a recluse in the film.

The Batman also explores grief, trauma, and the "horror" of living with post-traumatic stress disorder through Batman. Batman's initial antagonism towards Alfred and apathy towards Catwoman's situation stems from the death of his parents and his inability to communicate with people due to his fear of suffering more emotional pain. His obsession with solving the Riddler case is a method of coping with the trauma of losing his parents, while his obsession with being Batman is the result of channeling his rage into what Marcus Shorter of Bloody Disgusting called a "dogmatic dedication to his chosen crimefighting craft". The film ends with Batman realizing that he must process his trauma to help improve Gotham.

Batman's relationship with the police differs from previous Batman films. Burton's films depict the police as an incompetent force that Batman supersedes and Nolan's depict them bending the law to assist Batman. The Batman shows Batman having a hostile relationship with Gotham police, who see him as a criminal. Baker said that "[e]very time Batman interacts with the police, there's a palpable sense of discomfort; to them, Batman represents a level of oversight that they're not used to having to contend with." Baker called this "timely" given the contemporary American sociopolitical context including increased awareness of police brutality.

Tie-in media 

A prequel novel, Before the Batman: An Original Movie Novel, was written by David Lewman and released on February 1, 2022. It explores the origins of Batman and the Riddler. In March, Reeves announced The Riddler: Year One, a prequel comic book published bimonthly through DC's adult-oriented Black Label imprint beginning in October 2022. The six-issue limited series is written by Dano and illustrated by Stevan Subic.

Future

Sequels 
The Batman is intended to be the first of a new Batman film trilogy and establish a Batman-focused shared universe separate from the DCEU. Key cast members had signed on for future films by November 2019. In December 2021, Pattinson said he had ideas for developing Batman's character in further films, while Clark said The Batman would lay a foundation for future films to build upon. Pattinson and Reeves expressed interest in introducing Robin and featuring the Court of Owls, Calendar Man, Mr. Freeze, or Hush as villains in a sequel. A sequel was announced at CinemaCon in April 2022, with Pattinson and Reeves set to return. Later in August, Mattson Tomlin was confirmed to be co-writing the sequel script with Reeves. In January 2023, the first sequel was revealed to be titled The Batman – Part II, and is scheduled to be released on October 3, 2025, with principal photography set to begin in November 2023 at Warner Bros. Studios, Leavesden in England.

Spin-off series

The Penguin 

One week following the events of The Batman, the series explores the rise to power of Oswald "Oz" Cobblepot / Penguin in Gotham City's criminal underworld.

By September 2021, HBO Max was developing a spin-off series focused on the Penguin. Lauren LeFranc was hired as showrunner, with Reeves and Clark serving as executive producers. Farrell signed on to reprise his role and executive produce in December. Reeves compared the series to The Long Good Friday (1980) and Scarface (1983), charting Penguin's rise to power in Gotham's criminal underworld following the events of the film. The spin-off was the furthest along in development by March 2022, and Reeves said it would come before a sequel to The Batman. HBO Max ordered The Penguin as a limited series that month. In October, Craig Zobel was hired to direct the first three episodes of the series and to serve as an executive producer. Filming began in March 2023, in New York City. It is expected to last until mid-2023. The Penguin will consist of eight episodes.

Clancy Brown appears as Salvatore Maroni, a character who was referenced in The Batman.

Untitled Arkham series 
Reeves revealed in March 2022 that initial work on the GCPD series had led to work on a new idea based on the Arkham State Hospital. He said the series would build upon Arkham's introduction in the film and explore the origins of different characters related to it. He envisioned a horror tone, with Arkham being depicted as a haunted house. In October, Antonio Campos was hired to write and direct the series in addition to serving as showrunner and an executive producer.

Untitled Gotham City Police Department series 
In July 2020, HBO Max gave a series commitment to a police procedural television series centered on the Gotham City Police Department (GCPD), with Terence Winter set to write and serve as showrunner. Reeves, Winter, Clark, Daniel Pipski, and Adam Kassan were executive producing the series. In August, Reeves said the series would be a prequel to The Batman, taking place during the first year of Batman's career and focusing on the corruption in Gotham and the GCPD. He said the series would be told from the perspective of one particular crooked cop, with the story being a "battle for his soul", taking inspiration from Prince of the City (1981).

In November 2020, Winter left the project due to creative differences, and Joe Barton was hired to replace him in January 2021. HBO still had creative issues with the project, especially with its protagonist being a corrupt cop, and they encouraged Reeves to focus on existing comics characters instead. In March 2022, Reeves said the series was on indefinite hold, though he hoped to revisit the premise in the future. Wright revealed there had been discussions about him appearing in the series but he did not entertain the idea before the film's release. In October, the GCPD series was revealed to still be in development and would be separate from the Arkham series.

Other potential projects 
By October 2022, Reeves was meeting with directors and writers for several films and series that were in early development and centered on members of Batman's rogues gallery, such as Scarecrow, Clayface, and Professor Pyg.

Notes

References

Citations

Works cited

External links 

 
  at warnerbros.com
 
 Official screenplay

2020s English-language films
2020s serial killer films
2020s superhero films
2020s vigilante films
2020s American films
2022 action thriller films
2022 crime action films
4DX films
American action thriller films
American crime action films
American crime thriller films
American detective films
American films about Halloween
American neo-noir films
American police detective films
American serial killer films
American superhero films
American vigilante films
Batman films
Film productions suspended due to the COVID-19 pandemic
Films about corruption in the United States
Films about elections
Films about politicians
Films about terrorism in the United States
Films directed by Matt Reeves
Films postponed due to the COVID-19 pandemic
Films produced by Matt Reeves
Films scored by Michael Giacchino
Films shot at Warner Bros. Studios, Leavesden
Films shot in Chicago
Films shot in Glasgow
Films shot in Hertfordshire
Films shot in Liverpool
Films shot in London
Films with screenplays by Matt Reeves
Films with screenplays by Peter Craig
IMAX films
Productions using StageCraft
Reboot films
ScreenX films
Warner Bros. films